The National Delegation of the Youth Front (Spanish: Delegación Nacional del Frente de Juventudes) was a political-administrative body created in Spain in 1940, as an autonomous youth section of FET y de las JONS, the only authorized political party for the Dictatorship of General Franco (1936-1975).

The Youth Front was created for the framing and political indoctrination of the young Spaniards according to the principles of the so-called Movimiento Nacional, the conglomeration of political and social forces that supported the Military Uprising against the II Republic, which would give rise to the civil war with which Franco took power.

Prior to its creation, there had been a series of youth organizations of the parties that supported the Uprising, especially the "Pelayos", traditionalism youths, and the "Balillas", first name of the Spanish Falange youth organization and de las JONS, which was renamed Youth Organizations following the Unification Decree of 1937 and whose second and last Delegate was, until 1940, Sancho Dávila; these organizations were dissolved and integrated in the Youth Front to the creation of this.

With the evolution of Francoism, the Youth Front was adapting its aims and its composition to the political vicissitudes of the Regime; in November 1961 the denomination of Youth Front was changed to that of National Delegation of Youth, much less belligerent: and in January 1970, a major reorganization of the General Secretary of the Movement, the highest organ political regime, changes its name to National Delegation of Youth, with which it reaches the end of the Regime, in 1977.

Institutional purposes 
The aims of the Youth Front are clearly stated in its Foundational Law, and were addressed to the entire Spanish youth, both those affiliated voluntarily, and, and here lies the singularity of the Front and its influence on Spanish society at the time, the unaffiliated, who received the denomination of "framed" and were divided into "schoolchildren" (of all educational levels), "apprentices" (workers), and "rural" (peasants).

For affiliated youth, the purposes were the following (Article 7 of the Law):a) Political education, in the spirit and doctrine of the Movement.b) Physical and sports education.c) Pre-military education. d) Initiation to the Home female youth.e) Collaborate in the cultural, moral and social formation with the institutions to which they belong and provide religious education proper to the Church.f) Organize and direct camps, colonies, shelters, courses, academies and any other work of this kind, directed to the fulfillment of its functions.g) Complete, with respect to its affiliates, the work of the State, mainly in matters of health, education and work.

With regard to unaffiliated youth, the purposes were the following (Article 8): a) Political initiation.b) Physical education.c) The organization of how many summer colonies or similar institutions are subsidized by public Corporations and the inspection of those organized by private entities.d) The monitoring of compliance with the slogans of the Movement, as far as youth is concerned, in education and work centers.

Organization and structure 
For the best fulfillment of the competences attributed to the Youth Front, this was structured through different bodies, some of a personal nature and others, collective.

At the head of the Delegation was the National Delegate of the Youth Front, freely appointed by the National Chief of the Traditionalist Spanish Falange and of the National Syndicalist Movement Offensive Board, Francisco Franco, at the proposal of the Secretary General, on which he depended hierarchically, as stated in article 11 of the founding law. Nothing says in the legal text on the removal of the Delegate, but the Statute of the Movement, in article 23 determines that at the head of each service there will be a Delegate, "appointed and dismissed freely by the National Chief".

The organization was structured through services or departments to which they should develop the tasks entrusted. This structure was not stable and permanent, but, although it suffered several modifications, always maintained the foundational purposes.

The founding law pointed to the existence of a physical education advisor and another of religion, whose first holders were Lieutenant General Joaquín Agulla and Jiménez-Coronado, and the Patriarch Leopoldo Eijo y Garay, respectively.

Within the organization there were several units, as it was, especially in the first moments, the University Spanish Union (SEU), which attended the youth of higher education. Then there were the central Sections of Teaching, which competed everything related to the teaching activity that the Youth Front had entrusted; also everything related to the teaching staff of the National Spirit and Physical Education, as well as everything related to the textbooks of those subjects. The one of Work Centers attended to the working youth. One of the means employed was the so-called "Teaching Evenings", time that the companies gave to the Youth Front so that the apprentices could attend the activities and classes that the organization taught. Later, the "Vocational Training Competitions" began, which reached an international level. There was also a Rural Section that catered to peasant youth.

The Organic Standard of 1962 refers to the Section of Professional Activities, with two aspects: the Agricultural Training Work and the Vocational Training.

The founding law provided for the creation of the Naval and Air Sections. This last one did not come into existence and as for the Naval it had as its aim "the formation of young people who will normally do their military service in the navy, as well as those who aspire to exercise the professions of the navy or merchant, fishing fleet, and auxiliary services of the same.

Organization of affiliates 
The voluntarily affiliated youth formed the Phalanges of Volunteers, later called Franco's Youth Falanges, which were organized into three groups or legions: Arrows (from 10 to 13 years old), Cadets (from 14 to 16 years old) and Guides (from 17 to 20 years old). The basic unit was the squadron, and the commands were called squad leader, phalanx, century and legion. The command of the Youth Front of the province corresponded to the provincial assistant. As more outstanding activities of the Youth Front were households, camps, marches and mountain schools stood out.

In the 50s, the Youth Front was already clearly outdated, due mainly to his political and ideological component. This lag ends up leading to its dissolution. However, its sports and cultural component were still standing, leading in 1960 to the creation of the Spanish Youth Organization (OJE), which emerged as an independent youth association, devoid of political content and aimed at filling the free time for children and adolescents with their own educational project.

Services and activities 
The services and activities developed by the Youth Front were very broad and numerous, covering, in addition to the educational field, free time, culture and even information.

In the  free time highlights were mainly tournaments and competitions of sports activities, camps and hostels, cultural and leisure activities such as theater, model airplanes, school health and companies such as BCB (Blue Chain of Broadcasting), the Travel Office TEET (Tourism, Exchange and Educational Trips), the Spanish Network of Youth Hostels, the Youth Bazaar Network, and the Editorial Doncel, through which he edited comics as Balalín (1957-1959) and Trinca (1970-1973).

In the more strictly educational field, the Youth Front came to have a network of primary schools and one of minor schools (secondary education in boarding school), in addition to having the exclusivity of organization, teaching and evaluation, at all levels of education, of various subjects, the so-called "disciplines of the Movement": physical education, political education (which received different names as the Regime developed) and, for girls, several subjects that together constituted the so-called "home teachings". Even the Official School of Journalism came to depend on Youth, before the creation of the Faculties of Information Sciences.

The basic human support of the Youth Front was constituted by the Special Body of Instructor Officers trained in the Command Academy José Antonio of Madrid, graduated in physical education, civic-social training and camps.

References

Bibliography 
 Juventudes de Vida Española. Manuel Parra Celaya (2001).
 
 Los Campamentos del Frente de Juventudes. Cesáreo Jarabo Jordán (2007).
 Crónica del alpinismo español. César Pérez de Tudela.
 Juventudes en pie de paz. Escritos y discursos del creador del Frente de Juventudes. Enrique Sotomayor Gippini (2002).
 Auge y ocaso del Frente de Juventudes. Antonio Alcoba López (2002).
 Prietas las filas. Un niño en el frente de Juventudes. Luis del Val (1999).

External links 
 Cancionero del Frente de Juventudes
 Hermandad Doncel (Asociación de antiguos miembros de la O.J.E.)
 Historia de la O.J.E. 
 "El Frente de Juventudes en Aragón", Enciclopedia Aragonesa 
 Reunión de antiguos miembros del F. de JJ. en Ávila (Vídeo)
 Documental sobre campamentos del F. de JJ. (Vídeo)
 Montañas nevadas (Vídeo)

1940 establishments in Spain
1977 disestablishments in Spain
Youth organizations established in 1940
Organizations disestablished in 1977
Youth wings of political parties in Spain
FET y de las JONS
Fascist organizations
Youth wings of fascist parties